Hulsea algida is a species of flowering plant in the daisy family, known by the common name Pacific hulsea or alpine gold. It is native to the western United States.

Description

H. algida is a hairy, glandular perennial herb producing stout erect stems approaching 40 centimeters (16 inches) in height. The dark green leaves are narrow and covered in white hairs, and the edges are wavy and toothed. Most of the leaves occur in a thick patch at the base of the plant, where they can reach  in length, and some grow from the stems.

The center of the head is filled with yellow or orange disc florets and the circumference has up to 60 bright yellow or gold ray florets each about 1 cm long with rounded or toothed tips. The fruit is an achene up to 1 cm long with a pappus which may be longer.

Distribution and habitat
The species is native to California, Oregon, Nevada, Idaho, Montana, and Wyoming. Within California, it grows in the Sierra Nevada and in the White Mountains.

References

External links

Jepson Manual Treatment — Hulsea algida
United States department of Agriculture Plants Profile: Hulsea algida (alpine gold)
Hulsea algida — Calphotos Photo gallery, University of California

algida
Flora of the Western United States
Plants described in 1885
Flora without expected TNC conservation status